Acirc, acirc, or ACIRC may refer to:
Â/â ("A with circumflex"), for which the reference &Acirc;/&acirc; may be used
Advanced Cross Interleaved Reed-Solomon Code, an encoding used for magneto-optical discs